The Veterinary College, Bangalore was established on 25 July 1958 affiliated with Mysore University. The college started in a temporary shed located in the then Mysore Serum Institute, now called the Institute of Animal Health and Veterinary Biologicals, Hebbal. The Veterinary College became a constituent college of the University of Agricultural Sciences in 1965.

It became part of the newly established Karnataka Veterinary, Animal and Fisheries Sciences University, Bidar from April 2005. The college is located on the Bangalore to Hyderabad highway at a distance of about 7 km. from Vidhana Soudha.

There are 19 departments in the college - 
 Veterinary Anatomy 
 Veterinary Biochemistry 
 Veterinary Physiology
 Veterinary Microbiology
 Veterinary Parasitology
 Veterinary Pharmacology
 Veterinary Public Health
 Veterinary Pathology
 Veterinary Medicine
 Veterinary Surgery and Radiology
 Veterinary Gynecology and Obstetrics
 Veterinary extension education
Livestock production Management
 Livestock products Technology
 Veterinary Nutrition
 Animal Genetics and Breeding
 Poultry Science and more.

The courses offered are B.V.Sc. & A.H. (Bachelor of Veterinary Science and Animal husbandry), M.V.Sc. (Master of Veterinary Science) and Ph.D (Doctor of Philosophy). The college follows the course structure laid down by the Veterinary Council of India.

References

Veterinary schools in India
Colleges in Bangalore
Veterinary medical colleges in Karnataka
Academic institutions formerly affiliated with the University of Mysore
Educational institutions established in 1958
1958 establishments in Mysore State